The 2018 Grand Prix de la Ville de Lillers was the 54th edition of Grand Prix de la Ville de Lillers road cycling one day race. It was part of UCI Europe Tour in category 1.2.

Teams
Nineteen teams were invited to take part in the race. These included two UCI Professional Continental teams and seventeen UCI Continental teams.

General classification

External links

References

2018 UCI Europe Tour
2018 in French sport